Ayer Itam (also spelt Air Itam or Air Hitam) is a suburb of George Town in Penang, Malaysia. Ayer Itam is one of the well-known places to sample Penang cuisine, and includes a handful of major tourist attractions such as Penang Hill and Kek Lok Si Temple.

The area now known as Ayer Itam was first developed in the late 18th century, soon after the founding of Penang Island by Captain Francis Light in 1786. British officials intended to turn Ayer Itam, including Penang Hill, into an agricultural area and established spice farms. To this day, fruits and vegetables are still grown at the hills of Ayer Itam; fresh produce are then brought downhill daily to the wet markets throughout George Town.

Etymology 
Air Itam got its name from the murky waters of the Air Itam River (Malay: Sungai Air Itam). The phrase Air Hitam' means black water in Malay.
left|thumb|Suffolk House

 History 
Soon after the founding of Penang Island in 1786, British East India Company officials, led by Captain Francis Light, began exploring and clearing the interior of the island for agricultural purposes. Pepper and nutmeg farms were then established at the hills of Air Itam, while Light also commissioned the planting of strawberries at Penang Hill. The Anglo-Indian Suffolk House, one of Light's residences, was also built within a pepper estate by the Air Itam River.

The agricultural village of Air Itam grew throughout the 19th century, populated by farmers who owned the fruit and vegetable farms at the surrounding hills. To this day, fruits and vegetables are still produced at the hills of Air Itam and then distributed daily to the wet markets all over George Town.

In 1890, construction of the Kek Lok Si Temple, now one of the largest Buddhist temples in Southeast Asia, commenced. Its main pagoda combines Chinese, Siamese and Burmese styles. The temple was finally opened to the public in 1905.

Air Itam was once home to the Penang Zoological Gardens, the first zoo in Malaysia. Supposedly opened in the 1920s by a monk named Fa Kong, the zoo was shut down for good prior to World War II due to the excessive maintenance costs.

The Great Air Itam Fire of 1935 destroyed more than 100 homes in the area. At the time, the residences in Air Itam were mostly wooden; this incident led to the construction of brick buildings in Air Itam.

The area was also a hinterland which hid refugees fleeing from the episodes of violence that had occasionally erupted in George Town. For instance, the Penang Riots of 1867 forced some residents in George Town to evacuate to Air Itam. World War II, however, brought even greater numbers of refugees to Air Itam. During the war, when the Imperial Japanese Army implemented the Sook Ching purges, Air Itam became one of the sites where Chinese civilians were massacred.

The urbanisation of Air Itam since the 1950s has brought about a concurrent increase in living standards and transformed the landscape with more high rises, making Air Itam one of the more densely populated areas on Penang Island.  A new township named Farlim was also developed to the southeast in the 1980s.

 Geography 

Located in the valley between Batu Lanchang Hill, Bukit Penara and Penang Hill, this suburb of George Town is connected to the city by two main roads, Air Itam Road and Batu Lanchang Lane. It is also connected to Paya Terubong and the south of the island via Paya Terubong Road.

The suburb covers a broad area that incorporates Farlim, Thean Teik Estate, Rifle Range, Kampung Bahru, Kampung Melayu, Hill Railway Road and Hye Keat Estate, extending as far east as the junction with York Road.

 Transportation 
thumb|The peak of Penang Hill is accessible via the Penang Hill Railway, the sole rail system on Penang Island.Air Itam Road, which snakes its way from George Town proper all the way towards Paya Terubong, remains the major thoroughfare at Air Itam. Other major roads, such as Batu Lanchang Lane, Thean Teik Road and Thean Teik Highway, have been widened to cope with the increasing traffic.

Air Itam is also famous for Malaysia's only operating funicular rail system, the Penang Hill Railway. Designed and opened in the 1920s, this funicular rail, which climbs Penang's tallest hill, was originally equipped with Swiss coaches. It has since been upgraded twice – in 1977 and 2010.

Rapid Penang buses 13, 200, 201, 202, 203, 204, 306 and 502 serve the residents of the suburb, by connecting Air Itam with George Town to the northeast and other destinations on Penang Island, such as Paya Terubong, the Penang International Airport, Queensbay Mall and Balik Pulau. These routes are complemented by Rapid Penang's Congestion Alleviation Transport (CAT), a free-of-charge transit service within Air Itam.

Another bus service that caters specifically to tourists is the Hop-On Hop-Off service, which utilises open-topped double-decker buses. The Hop-On Hop-Off'' service includes stops at Penang Hill Railway Station and Kek Lok Si Temple.

 Education 

A total of 10 primary schools, three high schools and a technical school are located within Air Itam. Notably, Air Itam is home to Chung Ling High School, one of the premier Chinese schools in Penang. Founded in 1917, it has retained the consistent academic performance of its students.

The schools at Air Itam are as listed below.Primary schools SRK Ayer Itam
 SRK Padang Tembak
 SRK Seri Indah
 St. Xavier's Primary School
 SRJK (C) Chung Hwa Confucian
 SRJK (C) Kong Min Pusat
 SRJK (C) Kong Min Cawangan Satu
 SRJK (C) Kong Min Cawangan Kedua
 SRJK (C) Shang Wu
 SRJK (C) Sin KangHigh schools Chung Ling High School
 Chung Ling Private High School
 SMK Air ItamTechnical school'''
 SMT Tunku Abdul Rahman

Shopping 

At the time of writing, the sole shopping mall at Air Itam is All Seasons Place, which was opened in 2012. It is the first and only strip mall in Penang, where the retail outlets and eateries are arranged linearly along a sheltered sidewalk that faces Thean Teik Highway.

In addition, the hypermarkets and smaller supermarkets within the suburb, such as Sunshine Farlim, offer more local brands at cheaper prices, thus catering to the needs of the local community.

, a second shopping mall, Sunshine Tower, is under construction. The mall, which will also house the first modern cineplex within Air Itam, is slated for completion by 2019.

Tourist attractions 

 Penang Hill
 Kek Lok Si Temple
 Suffolk House
 Air Itam Market, where some of the most famous Penang dishes, such as asam laksa and curry mee, can be sampled
 Chinese Anti-War Memorial 
 Jade Emperor's Pavilion

Neighbourhoods 
 Farlim

References

External links

Populated places in Penang
George Town, Penang